The women's doubles of the 2011 Strabag Prague Open tournament was played on clay in Prague, Czech Republic.

Timea Bacsinszky and Tathiana Garbin were the defending champions but decided not to participate. 
Darya Kustova and Arina Rodionova defeated Olga Savchuk and Lesia Tsurenko in the final 2–6, 6–1, [10–7].

Seeds

Draw

Draw

External Links
 Main Draw

Strabag Prague Open - Doubles
2011 - Women's Doubles
2011 in Czech women's sport